This is a timeline of the world's largest passenger ships based upon internal volume, initially measured by gross register tonnage and later by gross tonnage. This timeline reflects the largest extant passenger ship in the world at any given time. If a given ship was superseded by another, scrapped, or lost at sea, it is then succeeded. Some records for tonnage outlived the ships that set them - notably the SS Great Eastern, and RMS Queen Elizabeth. The term "largest passenger ship" has gradually fallen out of use since the mid-1990s. Since that time the title of "largest cruise ship" has largely been given to those confined to cruising rather than transatlantic ocean travel.

Timeline

See also

 List of largest cruise ships
 List of largest ships by gross tonnage
 List of longest ships
 List of longest wooden ships
 List of large sailing vessels
 List of ocean liners

Notes

References

External links
Timeline by HMY Yachts - additional size visuals

Passenger Ships, Largest

Passenger Ships, Largest
Lists of cruise ships
Largest things by volume

de:Passagierschiff#Größenentwicklung der Passagierschiffe (nach BRT)(Auswahl)